Matthew Richards  (born 17 December 2002) is a British swimmer. Richards swam the third leg of the gold-medal winning Great Britain 4 x 200 metre freestyle relay at the 2020 Summer Olympics, the first British team to win the event since 1908. Previously, he had won two silver medals in team freestyle relays at the European Championships.

Early life
Matt Richards was born in Droitwich, Worcester, England, to Amanda and Simon Richards.  He started swimming when he was five years old at Droitwich Leisure Centre, and joined the Droitwich Dolphins Swimming Club when he was eight, later moving to  Worcester Swimming Club aged ten. He played other sports such as rugby and tae kwon do but gave them up to concentrate on swimming.  He was a student at Bishop Perowne Church of England College.

Career
Although born in England, Richards represented Wales as his father was born there. He broke the Welsh records in 100 and 200 metre freestyle. He became the junior champion in 100 m freestyle at the 2019 European Junior Swimming Championships held in Kazan.

He competed in the men's 100 metre freestyle event at the 2020 European Aquatics Championships, in Budapest, Hungary, and won two silver as part of the British team in the men's 4 × 100 metre freestyle and 4 × 200 metre freestyle relays. He was also part of the team that won gold in 4×100 m mixed freestyle, although he swam in the heats and did not swim in the finals.

At the 2020 Tokyo Olympics, he was in the men's 4 × 200 metre freestyle relay together with James Guy, Duncan Scott, and Tom Dean. He swam the third leg in 1 minute 45.01 seconds, a performance that helped the team win gold with a time of six minutes 58.58 seconds. The gold is Britain's first in 4 × 200 metre freestyle relay at the Olympics since 1908.

Richards was appointed Member of the Order of the British Empire (MBE) in the 2022 New Year Honours for services to swimming.

References

External links
 Matt Richards website
 

2002 births
Living people
British male swimmers
British male freestyle swimmers
Place of birth missing (living people)
European Aquatics Championships medalists in swimming
Swimmers at the 2020 Summer Olympics
Medalists at the 2020 Summer Olympics
Olympic gold medalists in swimming
Olympic gold medallists for Great Britain
Members of the Order of the British Empire
World Aquatics Championships medalists in swimming
Olympic swimmers of Great Britain
Swimmers at the 2022 Commonwealth Games
Commonwealth Games competitors for Wales
21st-century British people
People from Droitwich Spa
Sportspeople from Worcestershire
English people of Welsh descent
Welsh male swimmers